PRK can refer to:

 North Korea's ISO 3166-1 alpha-3 code
 Photorefractive keratectomy, laser eye surgery
 Phase reversal keying, a form of phase-shift keying
 People's Republic of Korea, short-lived 1945 government
 People's Republic of Kampuchea, 1979-1989
 Port Kent (Amtrak station), New York, US station code
 Phosphoribulokinase, an enzyme
 Puneeth Rajkumar, an Indian Kannada-language film actor